1734 Zhongolovich, provisional designation , is a carbonaceous Dorian asteroid from the central region of the asteroid belt, approximately 28 kilometers in diameter.

It was discovered on 11 October 1928, by Russian astronomer Grigory Neujmin at Simeiz Observatory on the Crimean peninsula. It was later named after Russian astronomer and geodesist Ivan Zhongolovich.

Orbit and classification 

Zhongolovich is presumably the largest member of the Dora family, a well-established central asteroid family of more than 1,200 carbonaceous asteroids, named after 668 Dora. The Dora family is alternatively known as the "Zhongolovich family".

Zhongolovich orbits the Sun in the central main-belt at a distance of 2.1–3.4 AU once every 4 years and 8 months (1,690 days). Its orbit has an eccentricity of 0.23 and an inclination of 8° with respect to the ecliptic. The body's observation arc begins 9 years after its official discovery observation at Simeiz, with its identification  made at Johannesburg Observatory in September 1937.

Physical characteristics 

In the SMASS classification, Zhongolovich is characterized as a Ch-subtype, a carbonaceous C-type asteroid which shows evidence of hydrated minerals.

Rotation period 

In August 2011, a rotational lightcurve of Zhongolovich was obtained from photometric observations by French amateur astronomer Pierre Antonini. Lightcurve analysis gave a well-defined rotation period of 7.171 hours with a brightness variation of 0.21 magnitude.

Diameter and albedo 

According to the surveys carried out by the Infrared Astronomical Satellite IRAS, the Japanese Akari satellite, and NASA's Wide-field Infrared Survey Explorer with its subsequent NEOWISE mission, Zhongolovich measures between 25.62 and 33.04 kilometers in diameter and its surface has an albedo between and 0.031 and 0.051.

The Collaborative Asteroid Lightcurve Link agrees with the results obtained by IRAS, that is, an albedo of 0.0456 and a diameter of 28.47 kilometers with an absolute magnitude of 11.7.

Naming 

This minor planet is named in honor of Russian astronomer and geodesist Ivan Danilovich Zhongolovich, who was the head of the Special Ephemeris Department at the Institute of Theoretical Astronomy (ITA) in St Petersburg. The official  was published by the Minor Planet Center on 20 February 1976.

References

External links 
 1734 Zhongolovich CCD Spectrum – PDS: Schelte J. Bus, Richard P. Binzel, October 2004
 Asteroid Lightcurve Database (LCDB), query form (info )
 Dictionary of Minor Planet Names, Google books
 Asteroids and comets rotation curves, CdR – Observatoire de Genève, Raoul Behrend
 Discovery Circumstances: Numbered Minor Planets (1)-(5000) – Minor Planet Center
 
 

001734
Discoveries by Grigory Neujmin
Named minor planets
001734
19281011